Michael Taylor (born in 1989) is a national team swimmer from the Marshall Islands. He has swum for the Marshall Islands at the 2005, 2007 and 2009 FINA World Championships.

References

Living people
1989 births
Marshallese male swimmers